Sun Ziyue (born 6 July 1996 in Nanjing) is a Chinese tennis player.

Sun has won two doubles titles on the ITF Circuit. On 18 November 2019, she reached her best singles ranking of world No. 340. On 18 August 2014, she peaked at No. 383 in the WTA doubles rankings.

At the 2013 Asian Youth Games, Sun won both the girls' singles and mixed-doubles titles.

Partnering Xu Shilin, Sun won her first $50k title at the ITF event in Sanya, defeating Yang Zhaoxuan and Zhao Yijing in the 2013 final.

ITF Circuit finals

Singles: 1 (runner–up)

Doubles: 4 (2 titles, 2 runner–ups)

See also
 Tennis at the 2013 Asian Youth Games

References

External links
 
 

1996 births
Living people
Sportspeople from Nanjing
Chinese female tennis players
Tennis players from Jiangsu
21st-century Chinese women